The men's sprint was one of the five track cycling events on the Cycling at the 1896 Summer Olympics programme. It was held on 11 April as the second event on the schedule. It was held over the distance of 2 kilometres, or six laps of the track. The event was won by Paul Masson of France, with his teammate Léon Flameng earning bronze. Stamatios Nikolopoulos of Greece took silver

Background

This was the first appearance of the event, which has been held at every Summer Olympics except 1904 and 1912.

Competition format

The event featured a single race, with all four competitors starting together. The distance was 2 kilometres, or six laps around the  kilometre track.

Schedule

The exact time of the event is not known; the cycling events began shortly after 2 p.m. and the sprint was the first event.

Results

Four athletes entered the race. Rosemeyer of Germany had mechanical problems during the race and left the course without finishing. The French cyclists took 1st and 3rd places, while Nikolopoulos of Greece finished second. The race was very slow and tactical, with Masson breaking away late to win easily.

References

  (Digitally available at )
  (Excerpt available at )
 

Track cycling at the 1896 Summer Olympics
Cycling at the Summer Olympics – Men's sprint